When a Woman Loves is the fourteenth studio album released by American singer Patti LaBelle. Her sixth ever on the MCA Records label, it was released on October 24, 2000 in the United States.

Background
By 2000, Patti LaBelle had achieved solo success with at least one platinum album and four gold albums. Four of the certified successes were with MCA Records, a company she had been an artist with since 1985. With the guidance of the label and with her husband, Armstead Edwards, LaBelle had finally achieved the solo success that had mostly eluded her since leaving the flashy pop group, Labelle, in 1976. It had been three years since her last album, the platinum-certified Flame, which yielded the modestly popular hit, "When You Talk About Love".

After winning a second Grammy Award for her live album, Live! One Night Only, LaBelle laid low. The marriage of LaBelle and Edwards seemed to be solid but in early 2000, the couple made news by announcing a trial separation after 31 years of marriage. The news shocked fans of the singer, who had told the media that the couple's relationship was built on their opposite differences. Following news of the separation, LaBelle returned to the recording studio to work on her next studio album for MCA Records. Noting the modest success they had with LaBelle's original 1989 version of "If You Asked Me To", LaBelle and the song's writer, Diane Warren agreed to work together on LaBelle's new album.

Recording
When A Woman Loves featured production from not only Warren and friend Denise Rich, who co-wrote several tracks, but also longtime producers Jimmy Jam and Terry Lewis, producers of LaBelle's last two hits, "The Right Kinda Lover" and "When You Talk About Love". Upon its release, when critics heard the new tracks, they thought that LaBelle's impending divorce from her husband Edwards was the cause of the sound from the tracks and from the singer's voice, though LaBelle would later deny such stories. Because Edwards had also served as LaBelle's manager for nearly 30 years, Edwards also left his position as manager leaving that position to the couple's son Zuri.

Commercial reception
Upon its release, When a Woman Loves tanked on the pop and R&B charts after its release in October 2000. The album's sole single, "Call Me Gone", failed to chart and was given poor radio airplay. Though the title track did get airplay and LaBelle sometimes sung the song during the record's promotion, it was never released as a single and the album dropped out of the charts after only ten weeks, becoming the first LaBelle studio album since This Christmas, to not be certified.

Track listing
All tracks written by Diane Warren.

Charts

References

2000 albums
Patti LaBelle albums
Albums produced by Jimmy Jam and Terry Lewis
MCA Records albums